Hope Defteros (born 1999/2000), known professionally as Hope D, is an Australian singer-songwriter and musician from Brisbane, Queensland. Defteros won Queensland Music Awards in 2020 and 2021. and is best known for her single "Second", released in 2020.

Career
In late 2019, Defteros released her debut single "Swim", which led her to be a finalist for the Billy Thorpe Scholarship. In 2020 she released three further singles: "Second" and "Common Denominator", and "Miscommunicate", in the lead-up to her February 2021 EP entitled Cash Only.

Defteros has performed at Splendour in the Grass, St Jerome's Laneway Festival, and King Street Crawl. She won the Emerging Artist award at the 2020 QMusic Awards.

On 17 September 2021, Hope D released "Happy Hangover", a song co-written with close friend G Flip. In a press statement, Hope D said the song is about "fully tripping out and having experiences that will later become nostalgic".

In July 2022, Hope D released "Emerald" and announced the forthcoming release of debut album, Clash of the Substance.

Discography

Studio albums

Extended plays

Singles

Awards and nominations

J Awards
The J Awards are an annual series of Australian music awards that were established by the Australian Broadcasting Corporation's youth-focused radio station Triple J. They commenced in 2005.

! 
|-
| J Awards of 2021
| Hope D
| Unearthed Artist of the Year
| 
|

Queensland Music Awards
The Queensland Music Awards (previously known as Q Song Awards) are annual awards celebrating Queensland, Australia's brightest emerging artists and established legends. They commenced in 2006.
 
|-
| 2020
| herself
| Emerging Artist Award
| 
|-
| 2021
| "Second"
| Rock Award
| 
|-

References

Notes

External links
 

21st-century Australian singers
21st-century Australian women singers
Australian musicians
Australian women singers
Musicians from Brisbane
Year of birth missing (living people)
Living people